The 2006 International Rules Series (officially the 2006 Coca-Cola International Rules Series) was the 13th annual International Rules Series and was played between Ireland and Australia.

The 2006 series involved two sell-out test matches, the first in Galway and the second in Dublin. Both of the matches were a landmark occasion for the International Rules Series and Irish sport; the Galway test was the first international rules series match to be played under floodlights in Ireland and the first match to be played outside Dublin, whilst the attendance for the second test was the largest in the history of international sport in Ireland.

Both tests were again controversial due to the off-field actions of the Australian team and the on-field actions of both teams, as well as injury to several players from both sides.

Fixtures 
 First test: 28 October 2006 at Pearse Stadium, Galway, County Galway, Ireland
 Second test: 5 November 2006 at Croke Park, Dublin, County Dublin, Ireland

Controversies

First test 
Graham Geraghty was cited for a knee to the head of Australia's Lindsay Gilbee.

Off-field controversy also dominated the series. Brendan Fevola's assault of an Irish barman which resulted in his being sent home from the Australian tour in the series brought the series into question for the behaviour and laid-back attitude which the professional Australian players have towards the series.

Second test 
A tackle by Australia's Danyle Pearce on Ireland's Graham Geraghty in the second test left Geraghty unconscious and requiring hospitalisation. The act was considered a "square up", further adding tensions to the series. Despite several on-field incidents, including a shirtfront by Adam Selwood which resulted in the broken nose of an Irish opponent and a headbutt to Australia's Ryan O'Keefe which left his face bloodied, red cards were not used and the actions were cleared by the match review panels.

Irish coach Seán Boylan publicly blamed thuggery and refereeing for Ireland's loss to Australia and called for the series to be scrapped. In December, 2006, the GAA decided not to participate in the series any further unless the Australians agreed to abide by a code of conduct and stricter rules regarding tackling.

Jim Stynes Medal 
Ryan O'Keefe was awarded the Jim Stynes Medal.

Squads 

 Click here for team squads
 Brendan Fevola was an emergency for the first test, but was sent home before the second game due to public misconduct. He was involved in a fight at a pub.
 Lindsay Gilbee and Sam Fisher only played in the first game, whilst Brett Peake and David Mundy only played in the second test.

Matches

First test

Second test

Women's series

Aftermath 
 The 2006 series is remembered as a significant turning point in the history of international rules football. The physicality and occasional violence in the second test marred the entire contest between the two nations and resulted in the Gaelic Athletic Association (GAA) abandoning the planned 2007 series and only agreeing to resume following a significant change to the game's code of conduct. On the pitch, Ireland manager Seán Boylan had to be convinced by his players not to abandon play at the end of the first, so serious was the off-the-ball meleeing. The sling tackle which resulted in a serious concussion to Ireland player Graham Geraghty and forced play to stop in the first quarter dominated discussion post-match, whilst the trading of barbs and insults between the teams was prolific both before and after the final test.

No player was later sanctioned by the Australian Football League (AFL) and GAA following the series, though a number of yellow cards (send-offs) were issued to players by both referees. The series would later go on to be ranked 10th by the Irish public in the one-off television program 20 Moments That Shook Irish Sport. Despite eventually returning in 2008, the International Rules Series struggled to maintain a place on the annual Irish and Australian sporting calendars, and it is worth noting that the no test match since has come remotely close to the rivalling the sell-out crowd 82,000 who attended the second test match on a Sunday afternoon at Croke Park. Others editorialised that the disgruntlement in the series demonstrated a difference in cultural values regarding aspects of the Indigenous Gaelic and Australian games such as umpiring methods and types of physicality deemed tolerable in the two sports.

See also 
 International rules football
 Gaelic football
 Australian rules football
 Comparison of Australian rules football and Gaelic football

References 

International Rules Series
International Rules series
International Rules Series
International Rules series
International sports competitions hosted by Ireland